Chann Suraj is a 1981 Pakistani Punjabi language Action film, directed by Rauf Abbasi and produced by Khursheed Ahmad. Film starring actor Sultan Rahi in the lead role and with Mumtaz and Mustafa Qureshi as the villain, Talish.

Cast
 Sultan Rahi – Heera
 Mustafa Qureshi – Suraj
 Mumtaz – Reshma
 Qavi Khan – Shaukat Ali
 Sabiha Khanum – Hajira
 Talish – Karnal
 Altaf Khan – Mr. Azam
 Ishrat Chodhary
 Ilyas Kashmiri – Chaudhary Hashim
 Rangeela
 Rehan
 Changezi
 Saleem Hasan
 Iqbal Durani 
 Nasrullah Butt
 Khawar Abbas
 Haidar Abbas

Track list

See also
 List of Pakistani Punjabi films

References

External links
 

Punjabi-language Pakistani films
Films set in the British Raj
Pakistani action films
1981 films
1981 action films
Historical action films